The Perodua Alza is a B-segment multi-purpose vehicle (MPV) produced by Malaysian car manufacturer Perodua. The first-generation model, based on the Daihatsu Boon Luminas, was launched in November 2009 as the company's first purpose-built MPV. The second-generation model that was introduced in 2022 is based on the W100 series Daihatsu Xenia.

The name "Alza" is derived from the Spanish verb "alzar", which means "to rise". The name came from an internal competition held amongst Perodua's staff during the car's development phase.



First generation (M500; 2009) 

The first-generation Alza, which is based on the Daihatsu Boon Luminas, was launched on 23 November 2009 and sold until 2022.

Second generation (W150; 2022) 

The second-generation Alza, which is based on the W100 series Daihatsu Xenia, was introduced in 2022. Received the "W150" model designation, it is assembled alongside the Malaysian market Toyota Veloz.

References

External links 
 
 

Alza
Cars introduced in 2009
2010s cars
2020s cars
Mini MPVs
Compact MPVs
Front-wheel-drive vehicles
Vehicles with CVT transmission
ASEAN NCAP small MPVs